Learning to fly or learn to fly may refer to:

 Fledging, a bird, bat or other flighted creature learning how to fly
 Flight training, in which a person takes lessons to fly an aircraft such as a helicopter or fixed-wing aircraft

Music
 "Learn to Fly", a 1999 song by Foo Fighters
 "Learn to Fly" (Surfaces and Elton John song), 2020
"Learn to Fly" (A1 song), 2002
 "Learn to Fly", a 2009 song by Greek stoner rock band  Nightstalker off the album Superfreak
 "Learning to Fly" (Pink Floyd song), a 1987 song by Pink Floyd
 "Learning to Fly", a 1986 song by Emerson, Lake & Powell from the album Emerson, Lake & Powell
 "Learning to Fly" (Tom Petty and the Heartbreakers song), a 1991 song by Tom Petty and the Heartbreakers

Other
 Learning to Fly, the 2001 autobiography of singer Victoria Beckham
 Learning to Fly (video), Hilary Duff's third video album